The Querino Canyon Bridge is located approximately  southwest of Houck, Arizona, on Old Route 66, over Querino Canyon.

It is a Warren deck truss bridge developed in 1929 by the Arizona Highway Department (AHD) as part of renovating and re-routing what was then U.S. Route 66 between Sanders and Lupton in Apache County.

The contractor was F.D. Shufflebarger; the material was produced by Inland Steel Company.

See also
 
 
 
 
 National Register of Historic Places listings in Apache County, Arizona

References

		
National Register of Historic Places in Apache County, Arizona
Buildings and structures completed in 1930
Bridges on U.S. Route 66
U.S. Route 66 in Arizona
Transportation in Apache County, Arizona
Road bridges on the National Register of Historic Places in Arizona